
Year 409 (CDIX) was a common year starting on Friday (link will display the full calendar) of the Julian calendar. In the Roman Empire, it was known as the Year of the Consulship of Honorius and Theodosius (or, less frequently, year 1162 Ab urbe condita). The denomination 409 for this year has been used since the early medieval period, when the Anno Domini calendar era became the prevalent method in Europe for naming years.

Events 
 By place 

 Roman Empire 
 Spring – Gerontius, Roman general (magister militum), who had been a partisan of Constantine III, revolts in Hispania. He elevates Maximus, his domesticus, as emperor.
 October 13 – The Vandals, led by King Gunderic, cross the Pyrenees into the Iberian Peninsula. They receive land from the Romans, as foederati, in Baetica (Southern Spain). The Alans occupy lands in Lusitania and the Suebi control parts of Gallaecia.
 The Visigothic king Alaric I lays siege to Rome a second time, bringing the inhabitants close to starvation. Emperor Honorius, safe in inaccessible Ravenna, refuses to negotiate for peace, despite repeated offers from Alaric, who then comes to terms with the Senate and sets up a rival emperor, Priscus Attalus, prefect (praefectus urbi) of the city.
 Honorius agrees that sons of prominent families at court in Ravenna be sent beyond the Danube as hostages; in return, later he calls up ten thousand Hun mercenaries.
 Famine strikes Hispania, Gaul and the Italian Peninsula.
  Bacaudic Rebellion: Peasants in Armorica, northwestern Gallia launch a revolt. The unrest continues until 417.

 Asia 
 Mingyuan, age 17, succeeds Daowu as emperor of the Chinese Northern Wei (one of the Northern dynasties).
 Battle of Linqu: Southern Yan is defeated by Eastern Jin.

Births 
 Daniel the Stylite, Christian saint (approximate date)
 Liu Yikang, prince of the Liu Song Dynasty (d. 451)

Deaths 
 Daowu, emperor of the Northern Wei (b. 371)
 Gao Yun, emperor of the Northern Yan
 Li of Yan, empress, wife of Gao Yun (who died the same year)
 Mallius Theodorus, Roman consul (approximate date)
 Serena, noblewoman and wife of Stilicho

References